These are the results of the men's C-1 1000 metres competition in canoeing at the 1948 Summer Olympics.  The C-1 event is raced by single-man sprint canoes and took place on August 12.

Final
With only six competitors in the event, a final was held.

References
 1948 Summer Olympics official report. p. 315.
 Sports reference.com 1948 C-1 1000 m results.

Men's C-1 1000
Men's events at the 1948 Summer Olympics